The Jolly Boys' Last Stand is a 2000 British satirical drama film written and directed by Chris Payne, and starring Andy Serkis and Milo Twomey with British comedian Sacha Baron Cohen in a minor role.

Plot

When Spider (played by Serkis), the President of a young men's drinking club becomes engaged, his oldest friend and best man, Des, (Twomey) decides to film the run up to the wedding as a gift to the betrothed – secretly hoping the on‐screen carnage will de‐rail the marriage.

DVD release

The DVD is distributed by Spirit Level Film. It includes a look behind the scenes at the original casting sessions held at Ealing Studios as director Chris Payne puts the cast through improvised auditions, plus an audio commentary from director Chris Payne, Andy Serkis, Milo Twomey, and Rebecca Craig.

External links
 

2000 films
2000 comedy-drama films
British comedy-drama films
2000s English-language films
2000s British films